Garra makiensis is a species of ray-finned fish in the genus Garra. It is endemic to Ethiopia.

References 

Garra
Fish of Ethiopia
Endemic fauna of Ethiopia
Fish described in 1904